Omuthiyagwiipundi (short: Omuthiya) is the capital of Oshikoto Region in northern Namibia, situated approximately  from Etosha National Park. It has about 5,000 residents. Prior to Omuthiya,  Tsumeb was the regional capital.
The town has been proclaimed in October 2007 and the Omuthiya Town Council established in September 2008.

Local authority elections
Omuthiya is governed by a town council that has seven seats.

Oshikoto Region, to which Omuthiya belongs, is a stronghold of Namibia's ruling SWAPO party. In February 2008, the town was the center of an election controversy as SWAPO faced the Rally for Democracy and Progress in the town's first local authority election. In 2010, SWAPO won Omuthiya with approximately 92% of the votes. For the 2015 local authority election no opposition party nominated a candidate, and SWAPO won uncontested.

SWAPO only narrowly won the 2020 local authority election. It obtained 746 votes and gained four seats. The Independent Patriots for Change (IPC), an opposition party formed in August 2020, obtained 630 votes and gained three seats.

References 

Towns in Namibia
Regional capitals in Namibia
Populated places in the Oshikoto Region